Karogs (Latvian: The flag) was a monthly literary magazine which was published in Latvia in the period between 1940 and 2010. Published by the Soviet Latvian Writers’ Union during the Communist period it was a semi-official publication.

History and profile
Karogs was launched as a monthly publication in 1940 just after the occupation of Latvia by the Soviet Union. The first issue appeared in September 1940. Its publisher was the Soviet Latvian Writers’ Union. The magazine did not only featured articles on literature, but also on art, and socio-politics. However, during the first five years it focused only on literature and was the sole literary publication in Soviet Latvia. From its start in 1940 to the late 1980s it was the supporter of the Communist regime featuring the Soviet literary work. The magazine strictly followed the slogan of the Communist Party: "Art has only one goal: the building of Communism."

Karogs was the first Latvian literary magazine which published the work by Latvian writer Ādolfs Erss in 1986. It folded in 2010.

Editors and contributors
The founding editor-in-chief of Karogs was Andrejs Upīts, and full list of its editors-in-chief is as follows:

 Andrejs Upīts (1940–1941; 1945–1946)
 Ignats Muižnieks (1946–1948)
 Andrejs Balodis (1948–1963)
 Kārlis Krauliņš (1964–1967)
 Andris Vējāns (1967–1989)
 Māra Zālīte, Māris Čaklais, Ieva Kolmane (1989–2010)

Under the editorship of Andrejs Upīts the editorial board members included Vilis Lācis,  Jūlijs  Lācis,  Arvīds  Grigulis,  Jānis  Niedre, and Žanis  Spure were the major contributors of Karogs.

In the 1960s Gunars Freimanis published several poems on environmental issues in the magazine. In its fiftieth anniversary issue dated September 1990 the magazine featured work by Rimants Ziedonis, Guntis Berelis, and Inguna Bekere and also, work by three American and one Russian writers.

Legacy
The State Archive of Latvia archived the issues of Karogs.

References

1940 establishments in Latvia
2010 disestablishments in Latvia
Communist magazines
Defunct magazines published in Latvia
Eastern Bloc mass media
Former state media
Magazines established in 1940
Magazines disestablished in 2010
Mass media in Riga
Magazines published in the Soviet Union
Defunct literary magazines published in Europe
Monthly magazines